Battle of Cửa Việt  was a battle in the Vietnam War, occurring between 25–31 January 1973 at the Cửa Việt naval base and its vicinity, in northeast Quảng Trị Province. The battle involved a combined task force of  South Vietnamese Marine and armored units that tried to gain a foothold at the Cua Viet Port just as the ceasefire was about to take effect on January 28 in accordance with the Paris Peace Accords. The South Vietnamese forces were finally forced to retreat by a North Vietnamese counterattack with considerable losses on both sides.

Background
In late October 1972 as part of the counteroffensive to the Easter Offensive launched by the People's Army of Vietnam (PAVN), the Army of the Republic of Vietnam (ARVN) began attacks north of Quảng Trị to try to regain positions along the south bank of the Cam Lộ/Cửa Việt River. The attacks were met with stiff PAVN resistance and were stopped at the Thạch Hãn River. A further attack from the coast by the Vietnamese Marines in November made limited gains. By the end of 1972 the Marines and ARVN occupied positions 5 km south of the river. As the ongoing peace negotiations would soon lead to a ceasefire, the South Vietnamese Joint General Staff sought the most advantageous battlefield positions possible and so ordered a further effort to regain the south bank of the Cam Lộ/Cửa Việt River.

Opposing forces
Since March 1972, the Cửa Việt base had been controlled by PAVN, particularly the 5th Regiment of the People's Navy of Vietnam.

On 15 January 1973 planning began for a final assault on Cửa Việt . A special combined unit called Task Force Tango was organized, consisting of the 3rd, 4th and 5th Marine Battalions and elements of the 1st Armored Brigade. The task force was put under the command of Colonel Nguyen Thanh Tri, Deputy Commander of the Republic of Vietnam Marine Division.

Battle
The operation began at 06:55 on 26 January with Task Force Tango advancing in two columns. Besides ARVN firepower, U.S. and naval gunfire of the United States Seventh Fleet was used to soften the target and hinder PAVN reinforcements. The PAVN put up fierce resistance to the attack, destroying 26 M-48s and M-113s with AT-3 missiles and shooting down two Republic of Vietnam Air Force planes with SA-7 missiles.

On 27 January an F-4 Phantom II of VF-143 was shot down while attacking PAVN forces north of Cửa Việt. Both crewmen ejected, the radar intercept officer (RIO) was captured and released on 27 March during Operation Homecoming, while the pilot Commander Harley Hall was killed. His remains were identified on 6 September 1994. An OV-10 Bronco #68-3806, call sign Nail 89 of the 23rd Tactical Air Support Squadron acting as forward air controller for the attempted rescue of the F-4 crew was hit by an SA-7 missile, both crewmen ejected and radio contact was established with one of them who said he was about to be captured. Neither crewman was returned during Operation Homecoming and both are listed as presumptive finding of death.

At 01:45 on 28 January the Marines made a final assault and by 07:00 had broken through the PAVN lines to recapture the base. At 08:00 in accordance with the Paris Peace Accords the ceasefire came into effect and the U.S. stopped all support for Task Force Tango. On the evening of 29 January, the PAVN launched a counterattack against Task Force Tango, and by the next day had succeeded in cutting off its lines of communication and began bombarding the encircled Marines. A Republic of Vietnam Navy LCM was destroyed as it tried to resupply the Marines. The Marines attempted to break out on the early morning of 31 January and the PAVN recaptured the base.

Aftermath
South Vietnamese losses were recorded as 40 casualties and 20 armored vehicles destroyed in the battle between 28–31 January.

References

1973 in Vietnam
Cua Viet
Cua Viet
United States Marine Corps in the Vietnam War
Battles and operations of the Vietnam War in 1973
Cửa Việt
January 1973 events in Asia
History of Quảng Trị province